The 2000–01 Azadegan League was the tenth and last season of the Azadegan League as first tier of Iran Football league that was won by Esteghlal. The following is the final results of the Azadegan League's 2000–01 football season.

Final classification

Player statistics

Top GoalScorers 

14
  Reza Sahebi (Zob Ahan)
 Ali Samereh (Esteghlal)
8
  Reza Ostovari (Zob Ahan)
  Amir Salamibakhsh (Est. Rasht)
  Amir Vaziri (Fajr Sepasi)
7
  Faraz Fatemi (Fajr Sepasi)
  Behrouz Rahbarifar (Persepolis)
6
  Behnam Abolghasempour (Saipa)
  Farhad Khangoli (Saipa)
  Rasoul Khatibi (PAS Tehran)

References 

www.rsssf.com
Persian League

 

Azadegan League seasons
Iran
1